Härma tsässon is a small wooden Seto St. Michael's chapel in Härmä village in Estonia.

General information
Tsässon was built with the help of the initiator Margus Timmo and the people from the neighbouring villages.

References

Chapels in Estonia
Setomaa Parish
Buildings and structures in Võru County